The Sula is a river in Nenets Autonomous Okrug and Komi Republic, Russia. It is a left tributary of the Pechora, flowing into its left branch Borshchyovy Shar near Velikovisochnoye, Nenets Autonomous Okrug.

References

Rivers of the Komi Republic
Rivers of Nenets Autonomous Okrug